Amarilla Veres (born 1 July 1993) is a Hungarian wheelchair fencer. She won the gold medal in the women's épée A event at the 2020 Summer Paralympics held in Tokyo, Japan. She also won the bronze medal in the women's team épée event at the 2016 Summer Paralympics held in Rio de Janeiro, Brazil.

References

External links 
 

Living people
1993 births
Place of birth missing (living people)
Hungarian female épée fencers
Wheelchair fencers at the 2016 Summer Paralympics
Wheelchair fencers at the 2020 Summer Paralympics
Medalists at the 2016 Summer Paralympics
Medalists at the 2020 Summer Paralympics
Paralympic gold medalists for Hungary
Paralympic bronze medalists for Hungary
Paralympic medalists in wheelchair fencing
Paralympic wheelchair fencers of Hungary